Madison de Rozario,  (born 24 November 1993) is an Australian Paralympic athlete and wheelchair racer who specialises in middle and long-distance events. She competed at the 2008 Beijing, 2012 London, 2016 Rio and 2020 Tokyo Summer Paralympics, winning two gold medals, three silver and a bronze. She has also won ten medals (three gold, three silver and four bronze) at the World Para Athletics Championships and four gold at the Commonwealth Games. De Rozario holds the world record in the Women's 800m T53 and formerly in the Women's 1500m T53/54.

Personal
De Rozario was born on 24 November 1993 and grew up in Perth, Western Australia. At the age of four, she developed transverse myelitis, a neurological disease which inflames the spinal cord and which resulted in her wheelchair use.

De Rozario's surname is of Portuguese origin. Her father was born in Singapore and her mother is originally from Australia.

Athletics

At the age of 14, de Rozario competed at the 2008 Beijing Paralympics and won a silver medal in the Women's 4x100 m T53/54 event as part of the Australian team. She also competed in the individual women's T54 100 m and 400 m events. She was coached by former Paralympic athlete Frank Ponta and is currently coached by Louise Sauvage. She did not win a medal at the 2012 London Paralympics. In 2012 and 2013, she won the Oz Day 10K Wheelchair Road Race.

At the 2013 IPC Athletics World Championships, in Lyon, France, de Rozario won a bronze medal in the Women's 800 m T53.

At the 2015 IPC Athletics World Championships in Doha, de Rozario won the gold medal in the Women's 800m T54 in 1:53.86. It was her first gold medal at a major international competition. She also won a bronze medal in the Women's 1500m T54 in a time of 3:42.03.

At the 2016 Rio Paralympics, de Rozario won two silver medals. She won her first individual medal at the Paralympics with a silver in the Women's 800m T53. In addition, she was a member of the team that won the silver medal in the Women's  Relay T53/54.

In November 2016, de Rozario was awarded the Wheelchair Sports WA Sport Star of the Year.

At the 2017 World Para Athletics Championships in London, de Rozario won the gold medal in the Women's 5000m T54, silver medal in the Women's 800m T54 and bronze medal in the Women's 1500m T54.

At the 2018 Commonwealth Games on the Gold Coast, Queensland, de Rozario won gold medals in the Women's 1500m T54 and Women's Marathon T54.

On 22 April 2018, de Rozario made a dramatic last dash sprint and won the 2018 London Marathon women's wheelchair title in a time of 1:42.58. She became the first Australian to win the women's wheelchair title.

At the 2019 London Marathon, which was also the 2019 World Para Athletics Championships marathon event, de Rozario won the bronze medal in the Women's T46. At the 2019 Championships track events held in Dubai, she won the gold medal in the Women's 800m T54 and two silver medals – Women's 1500m and 5000m T54.

De Rozario has won the Oz Day 10K Wheelchair Road Race eight times – 2012, 2013, 2017, 2018, 2019, 2020, 2021 and 2022.

At the 2020 Summer Paralympics in Tokyo, de Rozario won gold medals in the Women's 800m T53 and the Women's marathon T54, bronze in the Women's 1500m T54 and came fifth in the Women's 5000m T54. She is the second female Australian Paralympian after Jan Randles to win gold in the marathon at the Paralympic Games.

De Rozario won the 2021 New York City Marathon women's wheelchair race, defeating past champions Tatyana McFadden and Manuela Schär. She is the first Australian woman, either in wheelchair or open events, to claim victory on the 42km course.

At the 2022 Commonwealth Games in Birmingham, de Rozario won the Women's T53/54 marathon as well as the Women's T53/54 1500m. In doing so, she was the first Australian para-athlete to win four gold medals at the Commonwealth Games.

World records

Recognition
2018 – Cosmopolitan Women of the Year Awards – Sportswoman of the Year Award
2018 – UnioSport Australia – Outstanding Sporting Achievement
2018 – Athletics Australia Female Para-Athlete of the Year
2020 – Barbie's "Shero doll"
2020 – Paralympics Australia Female Athlete of the Year
2020 – Paralympics Australia Athlete of the Year 
2021 – NSW Institute of Sport Female Athlete of the Year with Jessica Fox.
2021 – Western Australia Sports Star of the Year
2022 – Medal of the Order of Australia for service to sport as a gold medallist at the 2020 Tokyo Paralympic Games
2022 – Athletics Australia Bruce McAvaney Award for Performance of the Year
2022 - Women's Health Australian Women in Sport Awards - Athlete of the Year

References

External links
 Madison de Rozario at Australian Athletics Historical Results
 
 

1993 births
Living people
Athletes (track and field) at the 2008 Summer Paralympics
Athletes (track and field) at the 2012 Summer Paralympics
Athletes (track and field) at the 2016 Summer Paralympics
Athletes (track and field) at the 2020 Summer Paralympics
Athletes (track and field) at the 2022 Commonwealth Games
Athletes (track and field) at the 2018 Commonwealth Games
Commonwealth Games medallists in athletics
Commonwealth Games gold medallists for Australia
Medalists at the 2008 Summer Paralympics
Medalists at the 2012 Summer Paralympics
Medalists at the 2016 Summer Paralympics
Medalists at the 2020 Summer Paralympics
Paralympic athletes of Australia
Paralympic gold medalists for Australia
Paralympic silver medalists for Australia
Paralympic bronze medalists for Australia
People with paraplegia
Wheelchair category Paralympic competitors
World Para Athletics Championships winners
Paralympic medalists in athletics (track and field)
New York City Marathon female winners
Recipients of the Medal of the Order of Australia
20th-century Australian women
21st-century Australian women
Medallists at the 2022 Commonwealth Games